Isaac Leonard Ellwood (August 3, 1833 – September 11, 1910) was an American rancher, businessman and barbed wire entrepreneur.

Early life
Ellwood was born in Salt Springville, New York. His first taste of business came as a young boy when he began selling sauerkraut. In 1851, Ellwood, like many others, headed west to the California Gold Rush.

DeKalb, Illinois

Ellwood found some success in California and returned east in 1855, to DeKalb, Illinois, where he opened a hardware and implements store. On January 27, 1859, Ellwood married Harriet Augusta Miller; the couple would ultimately have seven children. As Ellwood rose to prominence he began acquiring farm properties in and around DeKalb, Illinois. After the Civil War ended he began to import Percheron draft horses, many from France. Eventually, this resulted in a   stock farm near DeKalb.

Birth of barbed wire

In late 1872, Waterman, Illinois farmer Henry Rose developed a wire fence with an attached wooden strip containing projecting wire points to dissuade encroaching livestock. He patented his fence in May, 1873 and exhibited it at the DeKalb County Fair that summer. This prompted Ellwood along with other DeKalb area residents Jacob Haish and Joseph Glidden to work on improving the concept.  Ellwood patented a type of barbed wire in February 1874, but ever the businessman, concluded that Joseph Glidden's design was superior to his. He purchased one-half interest in Glidden's invention in July 1874. Glidden's patent issued in November, and together they formed the Barb Fence Company. In a few years, Glidden sold his half of that business to others, while retaining royalties from his patent. 

Ellwood continued in the manufacture of barbed wire as I.L. Ellwood Manufacturing Company. In the beginning they produced two-strand, twisted barbed wire in the back of Ellwood's hardware store. The business was quickly successful. Ellwood's hiring of John Warne Gates as a salesman propelled sales of barbed wire in Texas. 

Ranchers in the west found barbed wire fencing useful and much needed. As demand rose sharply, the company expanded, reorganized and merged and a successful Ellwood began construction on his Victorian mansion, the Ellwood House.

In 1881, I.L. Ellwood Manufacturing became Superior Barbed Wire Company under an expansion and reorganization plan. Seventeen years later the company would merge in the creation of John Warne Gates' American Steel and Wire monopoly, which was a predecessor of United States Steel.

Support for higher education
DeKalb is home to Northern Illinois University and Ellwood played a major role in making it a reality. It was Clinton Rosette who helped persuade Ellwood that the new Northern Illinois State Normal School should be in DeKalb. So convinced was Ellwood that he used all methods at his disposal to support the cause. His own capital, his time and his political influence were all used to gain DeKalb the new college.

Governor John Altgeld appointed Ellwood to the Board of Trustees, who were responsible for selecting a site for the normal school. This allowed him to assert all the more political influence. The bid was ultimately successful and the normal school eventually became NIU.

Texas ranching

In the ensuing time Ellwood's interest in ranching grew. On a trip to Texas in 1889 he purchased the 130,000 acre (530 km²) Renderbrook Ranch in Mitchell County. In all, at its height Spade Ranch and Ellwood's other Texas land holdings encompassed .

He built a ten-room "cottage" in Port Arthur, Texas which was an authentic copy of a Pompeiian villa from 74 CE.

Ellwood continued to acquire ranch land until almost the time he died, in Dekalb, Illinois in 1910.

Trivia

The borough of Ellwood City, Pennsylvania is named after Isaac L. Ellwood.
He is the brother of United States Representative Reuben Ellwood

Notes

References
Ellwood biography: from the University of Texas at Austin

External links
Biographical timeline
Ellwood House and Museum
Ellwood Pompeiian villa: Port Arthur Chamber of Commerce
Barbed Wire Museum
  – Isaac Ellwood, DeKalb, Illinois Improvement in Barbed Fences – "single piece of metal with four points, attached to a flat rail" (February, 1874)
Ellwood papers at Southwest Collection/Special Collections Library, Texas Tech University

19th-century American inventors
1833 births
1910 deaths
People from DeKalb, Illinois